Opostega spatulella is a moth of the family Opostegidae. It is known from France, the Iberian Peninsula, Italy, Austria, the Czech Republic, Slovakia, Hungary, Romania, Bulgaria, North Macedonia, Greece and Bosnia and Herzegovina. It is thought to be extinct in Great Britain. It is also found in the eastern part of the Palearctic realm (including Turkmenistan and Uzbekistan) and the Near East.

The wingspan is 9–11 mm. Adults are on wing from August to June and hibernate from October to April. There is one generation per year.

The larvae are known to feed on Ulmus and Salix species. They mine the bark of their host plant.

References

Opostegidae
Moths described in 1855
Moths of Europe
Moths of Asia